The Mexico City WCT was a men's tennis tournament played in Mexico City, Mexico from 1976 to 1978 and in 1982.  The event was part of the WCT Tour and was played on indoor carpet courts.

Finals

Singles

Doubles

See also
 Monterrey WCT

References

External links
 ATP tournament profile

World Championship Tennis
Tennis tournaments in Mexico
Defunct tennis tournaments in Mexico
Defunct sports competitions in Mexico
1976 establishments in Mexico
1982 disestablishments in Mexico
Sport in Mexico City
Recurring sporting events established in 1976
Recurring sporting events disestablished in 1982
Carpet court tennis tournaments